Beckingham may refer to:

Beckingham, Lincolnshire, England
Beckingham, Nottinghamshire, England
Beckingham railway station, defunct railway station in Nottinghamshire
Rowneybury House, Hertfordshire, England, otherwise known as Beckingham Palace
Beckingham (surname), people with the surname